Where dragons rule may refer to two power metal songs:
 "Where Dragons Rule", a song by Crimson Glory on 1988 studio album Transcendence
 "Where Dragons Rule", a song by DragonForce on 2002 studio album Valley of the Damned